Sylvester's law of inertia is a theorem in matrix algebra about certain properties of the coefficient matrix of a real quadratic form that remain invariant under a change of basis. Namely, if A is the symmetric matrix that defines the quadratic form, and S is any invertible matrix such that D = SAST is diagonal, then the number of negative elements in the diagonal of D is always the same, for all such S; and the same goes for the number of positive elements.

This property is named after James Joseph Sylvester who published its proof in 1852.

Statement 
Let A be a symmetric square matrix of order n with real entries. Any non-singular matrix S of the same size is said to transform A into another symmetric matrix , also of order n, where ST is the transpose of S. It is also said that matrices A and B are congruent.  If A is the coefficient matrix of some quadratic form of Rn, then B is the matrix for the same form after the change of basis defined by S.

A symmetric matrix A can always be transformed in this way into a diagonal matrix D which has only entries 0, +1 and −1 along the diagonal. Sylvester's law of inertia states that the number of diagonal entries of each kind is an invariant of A, i.e. it does not depend on the matrix S used.

The number of +1s, denoted n+, is called the positive index of inertia of A, and the number of −1s, denoted n−, is called the negative index of inertia. The number of 0s, denoted n0, is the dimension of the null space of A, known as the nullity of A.  These numbers satisfy an obvious relation

 

The difference, is usually called the signature of A.  (However, some authors use that term for the triple  consisting of the nullity and the positive and negative indices of inertia of A; for a non-degenerate form of a given dimension these are equivalent data, but in general the triple yields more data.)

If the matrix A has the property that every principal upper left  minor Δk is non-zero then the negative index of inertia is equal to the number of sign changes in the sequence

Statement in terms of eigenvalues
The law can also be stated as follows: two symmetric square matrices of the same size have the same number of positive, negative and zero eigenvalues if and only if they are congruent (for some non-singular ).

The positive and negative indices of a symmetric matrix A are also the number of positive and negative eigenvalues of A.  Any symmetric real matrix A has an eigendecomposition of the form QEQT where E is a diagonal matrix containing the eigenvalues of A, and Q is an orthonormal square matrix containing the eigenvectors.  The matrix E can be written E = WDWT where D is diagonal with entries 0, +1, or −1, and W is diagonal with Wii = √|Eii|. The matrix S = QW transforms D to A.

Law of inertia for quadratic forms 
In the context of quadratic forms, a real quadratic form Q in n variables (or on an n-dimensional real vector space) can by a suitable change of basis (by non-singular linear transformation from x to y) be brought to the diagonal form

 

with each ai ∈ {0, 1, −1}. Sylvester's law of inertia states that the number of coefficients of a given sign is an invariant of Q, i.e., does not depend on a particular choice of diagonalizing basis. Expressed geometrically, the law of inertia says that all maximal subspaces on which the restriction of the quadratic form is positive definite (respectively, negative definite) have the same dimension. These dimensions are the positive and negative indices of inertia.

Generalizations
Sylvester's law of inertia is also valid if A and B have complex entries. In this case, it is said that A and B are *-congruent if and only if there exists a non-singular complex matrix S such that , where * denotes the conjugate transpose. In the complex scenario, a way to state Sylvester's law of inertia is that if A and B are Hermitian matrices, then A and B are *-congruent if and only if they have the same inertia, the definition of which is still valid as the eigenvalues of Hermitian matrices are always real numbers. 

A theorem due to Ikramov generalizes the law of inertia to any normal matrices A and B: If A and B are normal matrices, then A and B are congruent if and only if they have the same number of eigenvalues on each open ray from the origin in the complex plane.

See also
Metric signature
Morse theory
Cholesky decomposition
Haynsworth inertia additivity formula

References

External links
 
Sylvester's law of inertia and *-congruence

Matrix theory
Quadratic forms
Theorems in linear algebra